Algeria, since December 18, 2019, is divided into 58 wilayas (provinces). Prior to December 18, 2019, there were 48 provinces. The 58 provinces are divided into 1,541 baladiyahs (municipalities). The name of a province is always that of its capital city. 

According to the Algerian constitution, a wilaya is a territorial collectivity enjoying economic and diplomatic freedom, the APW, or "Popular Provincial Parliament/Provincial Popular Parliament" (the Assemblée Populaire Wilayale, in French) is the political entity governing a province, directed by the "Wali" (Governor), who is chosen by the Algerian President to handle the APW's decisions, the APW has also a president, who is elected by the members of the APW, which Algerians elect.

List 
By 1984 the number of Algerian provinces were fixed at 48 and established the list of municipalities or "communes" attached to each province. In 2019, 10 new provinces were added.

The province numbers are the first 31 provinces (see the second section) in Arabic alphabetical order, after the adding of 17 more provinces in 1983 and 10 more in 2019, the old numbering was kept and the 27 provinces created since 1984 have been assigned codes from 32 to 58, in Arabic alphabetical order.

The following table presents the list of provinces, showing for each its numerical code, its name (which is at all times the same as the name of the capital city of the province), the number of districts ("dairas"), the number of municipalities, its area, and its population.

Since 2019 
On 26 November 2019, the Cabinet of Algeria passed a bill to add 10 more provinces, by splitting some of the larger provinces in the south of Algeria into smaller ones. Thus, the following provinces have been added on December 18, 2019:
 Bordj Badji Mokhtar Province
 In Salah Province
 Djanet Province
 In Guezzam Province
 El M'Ghair Province
 Touggourt Province
 Béni Abbès Province
 Timimoun Province
 Ouled Djellal Province
 El Menia Province

1984-2019

In 1984 17 new provinces were added. These provinces included:
 El Bayadh
 Illizi
 Bordj Bou Arréridj
 Boumerdès
 El Taref
 Tindouf
 Tissemsilt
 El Oued
 Khenchela
 Souk Ahras
 Tipaza
 Mila
 Aïn Defla
 Naâma 
 Aïn Témouchent
 Ghardaïa
 Relizane

1974-1983

The 15 departments were reorganized to form 31 provinces:

1957-1974

Immediately after independence, Algeria retained its 15 former French départements, which were renamed wilayas (provinces) in 1968, for the most part, with some name changes:

8A-El Wahat (Currently Ouargla, formerly Oasis)
8B-Saoura (Currently Béchar)
9A-Alger (Algiers)
9B-Batna
9C-Annaba (Formerly Bône, English: Bona)
9D-Constantine
9E-Médéa
9F-Mostaganem
9G-Oran
9H-Orléansville (Then El Asnam, now Chlef)
9J-Sétif
9K-Tiaret
9L-Tizi-Ouzou
9M-Tlemcen
9R-Saïda

1954-1962
During the Algerian War of Independence, the FLN adopted an organizational system divided by 6 numbered wilayas:

Aurès
Constantine
Kabylie
Algiers
Oran
Sahara

See also
Municipalities of Algeria
List of Algerian Provinces by population
List of Algerian Provinces by area
List of Algerian regions by Human Development Index
ISO 3166-2:DZ

References

External links
 National Statistics Office

 
Subdivisions of Algeria
Algeria, Provinces
Algeria 1
Provinces, Algeria
Provinces